Denis Tabako (born 20 February 1974) is a Belarusian rower. He competed in the men's quadruple sculls event at the 1996 Summer Olympics.

References

External links
 

1974 births
Living people
Belarusian male rowers
Olympic rowers of Belarus
Rowers at the 1996 Summer Olympics
Sportspeople from Minsk